Mersin İdmanyurdu (also Mersin İdman Yurdu, Mersin İY, or MİY) Sports Club; located in Mersin, east Mediterranean coast of Turkey in 1974–75. Mersin İdmanyurdu had relegated from Turkish First Football League in 1973–74 season. It was the first relegation of the team after 7 season first league experience. The 1974–75 season was the fifth season of Mersin İdmanyurdu (MİY) football team in Turkish Second Football League, the second level division in Turkey. They finished 3rd in the red group.

Pre-season
 MİY-Adana Demirspor: 0-0.
 MİY-Göztepe: 3-1.
 MİY-Gençlerbirliği: 2-0.

1974–75 Second League participation
In its 12th season (1974–75), Second League was played with 32 teams, 16 in red group and 16 in white group. Group winners promoted to First League 1975–76 and last teams relegated to Third League 1975–76 in each group. Mersin İY became 3rd with 14 wins in Red Group.

Results summary
Mersin İdmanyurdu (MİY) 1974–75 Second League Red Group league summary:

Sources: 1974–75 Turkish Second Football League pages.

League table
Mersin İY's league performance in Second League Red Group in 1974-75 season is shown in the following table.

Note: Won, drawn and lost points are 2, 1 and 0. F belongs to MİY and A belongs to corresponding team for both home and away matches.

Results by round
Results of games MİY played in 1974–75 Second League Red Group by rounds:

First half

Mid-season
Friendly game during half-season: 
 MİY–Adanaspor: 2–1.
 09.02.1975 - MİY–Mersin Demirspor.

Second half

1974–75 Turkish Cup participation
1974–75  Turkish Cup was played for the 13th season as Türkiye Kupası by 22 teams. Two elimination rounds and finals were played in two-legs elimination system. Top ten first division teams from previous season participated. Mersin İdmanyurdu did not participate in 1974–75  Turkish Cup because they had finished previous season at 15th place. Beşiktaş won the Cup for the first time and became eligible for 1975–76 ECW Cup.

Management

Club management
Kaya Mutlu was club president.

Coaching team

1974–75 Mersin İdmanyurdu head coaches:

Note: Only official games were included.

1974–75 squad
Stats are counted for 1974–75 Second League matches. In the team rosters five substitutes were allowed to appear, two of whom were substitutable. Only the players who appeared in game rosters were included and listed in the order of appearance.

Sources: 1974–75 season squad data from maçkolik com, Milliyet, and Erbil (1975).

Transfer news from Milliyet:
 Transfers in (Summer 1974): MF Doğan (Göztepe); Kamuran (Eskişehirspor); Metin (Ankaragücü).
 Transfers out (summer 1975): Nevruz (Fenerbahçe).

See also
 Football in Turkey
 1974–75 Turkish Second Football League
 1974–75 Turkish Cup

Notes and references

Mersin İdman Yurdu seasons
Turkish football clubs 1974–75 season